The first season of The Crown follows the life and reign of Queen Elizabeth II. It consists of ten episodes and was released on Netflix on 4 November 2016.

Claire Foy stars as Elizabeth, with main cast members Matt Smith, Vanessa Kirby, Eileen Atkins, Jeremy Northam, Victoria Hamilton, Ben Miles, Greg Wise, Jared Harris, John Lithgow, Alex Jennings, and Lia Williams.

Premise 
The Crown traces the life of Queen Elizabeth II from her wedding in 1947 through to the present day. 

The first season, in which Claire Foy portrays the Queen in the early part of her reign, depicts events up to 1955, taking in the death of King George VI, prompting Elizabeth’s accession to the throne, and leading up to the resignation of Winston Churchill as prime minister and the Queen's sister Princess Margaret deciding not to marry Peter Townsend.

Cast

Main 

 Claire Foy as Princess Elizabeth and later Queen Elizabeth II
 Matt Smith as Philip Mountbatten, Duke of Edinburgh, Elizabeth's husband
 Vanessa Kirby as Princess Margaret, Elizabeth's younger sister
 Eileen Atkins as Queen Mary, Elizabeth's grandmother and great-granddaughter of King George III
 Jeremy Northam as Anthony Eden, Churchill's Deputy Prime Minister and Foreign Secretary, who succeeds him as Prime Minister
 Victoria Hamilton as Queen Elizabeth, King George VI's wife and Elizabeth II's mother, known as Queen Elizabeth The Queen Mother during her daughter's reign
 Ben Miles as Group Captain Peter Townsend, George VI's equerry, who hopes to marry Princess Margaret
 Greg Wise as Louis Mountbatten, 1st Earl Mountbatten of Burma, Philip's ambitious uncle and great-grandson of Queen Victoria
 Jared Harris as King George VI, Elizabeth's father, known to his family as Bertie
 John Lithgow as Winston Churchill, the Queen's first Prime Minister
 Alex Jennings as Prince Edward, Duke of Windsor, formerly King Edward VIII, who abdicated in favour of his younger brother Bertie to marry Wallis Simpson; known to his family as David
 Lia Williams as Wallis, Duchess of Windsor, Edward's American wife

Featured 
The following actor is credited in the opening titles of a single episode:
Stephen Dillane as Graham Sutherland, a noted artist who paints a portrait of the ageing Churchill

Recurring 

 Billy Jenkins as young Prince Charles, Elizabeth and Philip's son 
 Grace and Amelia Gilmour as young Princess Anne, Elizabeth and Philip's daughter (uncredited)
 Clive Francis as Lord Salisbury, Leader of the House of Lords 
 Pip Torrens as Tommy Lascelles, Private Secretary to King George VI; later Private Secretary to the Queen 
 Harry Hadden-Paton as Martin Charteris, Private Secretary to Princess Elizabeth; later Assistant Private Secretary to the Queen 
 Daniel Ings as Mike Parker, Private Secretary to the Duke of Edinburgh 
 Lizzy McInnerny as Margaret "Bobo" MacDonald, Principal Dresser to the Queen 
 Patrick Ryecart as The Duke of Norfolk, Earl Marshal 
 Will Keen as Michael Adeane, Assistant Private Secretary to the Queen; later Private Secretary to the Queen 
 James Laurenson as Doctor Weir, Physician to King George VI; later Physician to the Queen 
 Mark Tandy as Cecil Beaton, Court Photographer to the British Royal Family 
 Harriet Walter as Clementine Churchill, Winston Churchill's wife 
 Nicholas Rowe as Jock Colville, Sir Winston Churchill's private secretary 
 Simon Chandler as Clement Attlee, Former Prime Minister of the United Kingdom 
 Kate Phillips as Venetia Scott, Sir Winston Churchill's secretary 
 Ronald Pickup as Geoffrey Fisher, Archbishop of Canterbury 
 Nigel Cooke as Harry Crookshank, Minister of Health 
 Patrick Drury as The Earl of Scarbrough, Lord Chamberlain 
 John Woodvine as Cyril Garbett, Archbishop of York 
 Rosalind Knight as Princess Alice of Battenberg, Philip's mother 
 Andy Sanderson as Prince Henry, Duke of Gloucester, Elizabeth's uncle (and Edward VIII and George VI's brother)
 Michael Culkin as Rab Butler, Chairman of the Conservative Party 
 George Asprey as Walter Monckton, Minister of Defence 
 Verity Russell as young Princess Elizabeth 
 Beau Gadsdon as young Princess Margaret 
 James Hillier as Equerry 
 Jo Stone-Fewings as Collins 
 Anna Madeley as Clarissa Eden, Anthony Eden's wife (and Sir Winston Churchill's niece) 
 Tony Guilfoyle as Michael Ramsey, Bishop of Durham; later Archbishop of York 
 Nick Hendrix as Billy Wallace, Princess Margaret's close friend 
 Josh Taylor as Johnny Dalkeith, nephew of the Duchess of Gloucester 
 David Shields as Colin Tennant, Princess Margaret's close friend; later Lady Anne Coke's fiancé 
 Paul Thornley as Bill Mattheson

Guest 

 Michael Bertenshaw as Piers Legh, Master of the Household 
 Julius D'Silva as Baron Nahum, Court Photographer to the British Royal Family 
 Alan Williams as Professor Hogg 
 Michael Cochrane as Henry Marten, Vice-Provost of Eton and the Queen's private tutor
 Jo Herbert as Mary Charteris, Martin Charteris's wife 
 Richard Clifford as Norman Hartnell, Royal Warrant as Dressmaker to the Queen 
 Joseph Kloska as Porchey, Horse Racing Manager to the Queen 
 Amir Boutrous as Gamal Abdel Nasser, President of Egypt 
 Abigail Parmenter as Judy Montagu

Episodes

Release 
The series's first two episodes were released theatrically in the United Kingdom on 1 November 2016. The first season was released on Netflix worldwide in its entirety on 4 November 2016. Season one was released on DVD and Blu-ray in the United Kingdom on 16 October 2017 and worldwide on 7 November 2017.

Music 

All music composed by Rupert Gregson-Williams, except where noted:

Reception 

The review aggregator website Rotten Tomatoes reported 88% approval for the first season based on 72 reviews, with an average rating of 8.55/10. Its critical consensus reads, "Powerful performances and lavish cinematography make The Crown a top-notch production worthy of its grand subject." On Metacritic, the series holds a score of 81 out of 100, based on 29 critics, indicating "universal acclaim".

The Guardians TV critic Lucy Mangan praised the series and wrote that "Netflix can rest assured that its £100m gamble has paid off. This first series, about good old British phlegm from first to last, is the service's crowning achievement so far." Writing for The Daily Telegraph, Ben Lawrence said, "The Crown is a PR triumph for the Windsors, a compassionate piece of work that humanises them in a way that has never been seen before. It is a portrait of an extraordinary family, an intelligent comment on the effects of the constitution on their personal lives and a fascinating account of postwar Britain all rolled into one." Writing for The Boston Globe, Matthew Gilbert also praised the series saying it "is thoroughly engaging, gorgeously shot, beautifully acted, rich in the historical events of postwar England, and designed with a sharp eye to psychological nuance". Vicki Hyman of The Star-Ledger described it as "sumptuous, stately but never dull". The A.V. Clubs Gwen Ihnat said it adds "a cinematic quality to a complex and intricate time for an intimate family. The performers and creators are seemingly up for the task".

The Wall Street Journal critic Dorothy Rabinowitz said, "We're clearly meant to see the duke [of Windsor] as a wastrel with heart. It doesn't quite come off—Mr. Jennings is far too convincing as an empty-hearted scoundrel—but it's a minor flaw in this superbly sustained work." Robert Lloyd writing for the Los Angeles Times said, "As television it's excellent—beautifully mounted, movingly played and only mildly melodramatic." Hank Stuever of The Washington Post also reviewed the series positively: "Pieces of The Crown are more brilliant on their own than they are as a series, taken in as shorter, intently focused films". Neil Genzlinger of The New York Times said, "This is a thoughtful series that lingers over death rather than using it for shock value; one that finds its story lines in small power struggles rather than gruesome palace coups." The Hollywood Reporters Daniel Fienberg said the first season "remains gripping across the entirety of the 10 episodes made available to critics, finding both emotional heft in Elizabeth's youthful ascension and unexpected suspense in matters of courtly protocol and etiquette". Other publications such as USA Today, Indiewire, The Atlantic, CNN and Variety also reviewed the series positively.

Some were more critical of the show. In a review for Time magazine, Daniel D'Addario wrote that it "will be compared to Downton Abbey, but that .. was able to invent ahistorical or at least unexpected notes. Foy struggles mightily, but she's given little...The Crowns Elizabeth is more than unknowable. She's a bore". Vultures Matt Zoller Seitz concluded, "The Crown never entirely figures out how to make the political and domestic drama genuinely dramatic, much less bestow complexity on characters outside England's innermost circle." Verne Gay of Newsday said, "Sumptuously produced but glacially told, The Crown is the TV equivalent of a long drive through the English countryside. The scenery keeps changing, but remains the same." Slate magazine's Willa Paskin, commented: "It will scratch your period drama itch—and leave you itchy for action."

Awards
John Lithgow won the 2017 Primetime Emmy Award for Outstanding Supporting Actor in a Drama Series for his performance in the episode "Assassins."

References

External links
 * 
 

2016 American television seasons
2016 British television seasons
1